Funky Lab Rat is a downloadable-only puzzle-platform game for the PlayStation 3. It was created by independent developer Hydravision Entertainment, and published by Sony Computer Entertainment America in 2010. The game was removed sometime in 2012, but the demo remained available until 2015.

Gameplay
Funky Lab Rat is a puzzle-platform game that makes use of the PlayStation Move. The player plays a disco-dressed lab rat with a magic wand that has DVD-like powers. The player can pause time and rearrange platforms, rewind time to prevent death, simply reset the level, or can automatically finish the level by fast-forwarding. The goal is to collect a set number of pills and reach the end of the level.

2010 video games
Hydravision Entertainment games
PlayStation 3 games
PlayStation 3-only games
PlayStation Move-compatible games
PlayStation Move-only games
PlayStation Network games
Puzzle-platform games
Single-player video games
Sony Interactive Entertainment games
Video games about mice and rats
Video games developed in France
Video games with time manipulation